The Yenisey (Yeniséy; , Gorlog mörön; Buryat: Горлог мүрэн, Gorlog müren; Tuvan: Улуг-Хем, Uluğ-Hem; Khakas: Ким суғ, Kim suğ; Ket: Ӄук, Quk; Nenets: Ензя-ям’, Enzja-jam), also romanised as Yenisei, Enisei, or Jenisej, is the fifth-longest river system in the world, and the largest to drain into the Arctic Ocean. 

Rising in Mungaragiyn-gol in Mongolia, it follows a northerly course through Lake Baikal and the Krasnoyarsk Dam before draining into the Yenisey Gulf in the Kara Sea. The Yenisey divides the Western Siberian Plain in the west from the Central Siberian Plateau to the east; it drains a large part of central Siberia.

It is the central one of three large Siberian rivers that flow into the Arctic Ocean (the other two being the Ob and the Lena).

Geography

The Yenisey flows through the Russian federal subjects Tuva, Khakassia and Krasnoyarsk Krai. The city of Krasnoyarsk is situated on the Yenisey.

Tributaries

The largest tributaries of the Yenisey are, from source to mouth:

 Little Yenisey (left)
 Great Yenisey (right)
 Khemchik (left)
 Kantegir (left)
 Abakan (left)
 Tuba (right)
 Mana (right)
 Bazaikha (right)
 Kacha (left)
 Kan (right)
 Angara (right)
 Kem (left)
 Bolshoy Pit (right)
 Sym (left)
 Dubches (left)
 Podkamennaya Tunguska (right)
 Bakhta (right)
 Yeloguy (left)
 Nizhnyaya Tunguska (right)
 Turukhan (left)
 Kureyka (right)
 Khantayka (right)
 Bolshaya Kheta (left)
 Tanama (left)

Lake Baikal

A significant feature of the Upper Yenisei is Lake Baikal, the deepest and oldest lake in the world.

Brekhovskie Islands
The Brekhovskie Islands (Russian-language article: Бреховские острова) lie in the Yenisey estuary and have an area of some 1,400,000 hectares. They provide a wetland habitat for rare and endangered birds and are an internationally important nesting and breeding area for several types of waterfowl. The most north-easterly of the islands, Nosonovskij Ostrov ("Nose Island") was visited by Fridtjof Nansen in 1913.

Flora and fauna
The grayling is restricted to Khövsgöl Nuur and its tributaries. Most fish found in the Yenisey basin are relatively widespread Euro-Siberian or Siberian species, such as northern pike (Esox lucius), common roach (Rutilus rutilus), common dace (Leuciscus leuciscus), Siberian sculpin (Cottus poecilopus), European perch (Perca fluviatilis) and Prussian carp (Carassius gibelio). The basin is also home to many salmonids (trout, whitefish, charr, graylings, taimen and relatives) and the Siberian sturgeon (Acipenser baerii).

The Yenisey valley is habitat for numerous flora and fauna, with Siberian pine and Siberian larch being notable tree species. In prehistoric times Scots pine, Pinus sylvestris, was abundant in the Yenisey valley circa 6000 BC. There are also numerous bird species present in the watershed, including, for example, the hooded crow, Corvus cornix.

Taimyr reindeer herd
The Taimyr herd of tundra reindeer (Rangifer tarandus sibiricus), the largest reindeer herd in the world, migrates to winter grazing ranges along the Yenisey. It had an estimated 800,000-850,000 individuals as of 2010, but has peaked at over one million.

Navigation

River steamers first came to the Yenesei River in 1864 and were brought in from Holland and England across the icy Kara Sea. One was the SS Nikolai. The SS Thames attempted to explore the river, overwintered in 1876, but was damaged in the ice and eventually wrecked in the river. Success came with the steamers Frazer, Express in 1878, and the next year, Moscow hauling supplies in and wheat out. The Dalman reached Yeniseisk in 1881.

Imperial Russia placed river steamers on the massive river in an attempt to free up communication with land-locked Siberia. One boat was the SS St. Nicholas which took the future Tsar Nicholas II on his voyage to Siberia, and later conveyed Vladimir Lenin to prison.

Engineers attempted to place river steamers in regular service on the river during the building of the Trans-Siberian Railway. The boats were needed to bring in the rails, engines and supplies. Captain Joseph Wiggins sailed the Orestes with rail in 1893. However, the sea and river route proved very difficult with several ships lost at sea and on the river. Both the Ob and Yenisey mouths feed into very long inlets, several hundred kilometres in length, which are shallow, ice bound and prone to high winds and thus treacherous  for navigation. After the completion of the railway, river traffic reduced only to local service as the Arctic route and long river proved much too indirect a route.

The first recreation team to navigate the Yenisey's entire length, including its violent upper tributary in Mongolia, was an Australian-Canadian effort completed in September 2001.  Ben Kozel, Tim Cope, Colin Angus and Remy Quinter were on this team.  Both Kozel and Angus wrote books detailing this expedition, and a documentary was produced for National Geographic Television.

A canal inclined plane was built on the river in 1985 at the Krasnoyarsk Dam.

History
Nomadic tribes such as the Ket people and the Yugh people have lived along the banks of the Yenisey since ancient times, and this region is the location of the Yeniseian language family. The Ket, numbering about 1000,  are the only survivors today of those who originally lived throughout central southern Siberia near the river banks. Their extinct relatives included the Kotts, Assans, Arins, Baikots and Pumpokols who lived further upriver to the south. The modern Ket lived in the eastern middle areas of the river before being assimilated politically into Russia during the 17th through 19th centuries.

Some of the earliest known evidence of Turkic origins was found in the Yenisey Valley in the form of stelae, stone monoliths and memorial tablets dating from between the seventh and ninth centuries AD, along with some documents that were found in China's Xinjiang region. The written evidence gathered from these sources tells of battles fought between the Turks and the Chinese and other legends. There are also examples of Uyghur poetry, though most have survived only in Chinese translation.

Wheat from the Yenisey was sold by Muslims and Uighurs during inadequate harvests to Bukhara and Soghd during the Tahirid era.

Russians first reached the upper Yenisey in 1605, travelling from the Ob, up the Ket, portaging and then down the Yenisey as far as the Sym.

During World War II, Nazi Germany and the Japanese Empire agreed to divide Asia along a line that followed the Yenisey to the border of China and then along the border of China and the Soviet Union.

Pollution
Studies have shown that the Yenisey suffers from contamination caused by radioactive discharges from a factory that produced bomb-grade plutonium in the secret city of Krasnoyarsk-26, now known as Zheleznogorsk.

Gallery

See also

 List of rivers of Russia
 Sayano-Shushenskaya Dam
 Yenisey Range

References

External links

 Photos of river around Krasnoyarsk area at Boston.com
 William Barr, "German paddle-steamers on the Yenisey 1878-84", The Journal of the Hakluyt Society, August 2014.
 

 
 
Rivers of Krasnoyarsk Krai
Rivers of Khakassia
Rivers of Tuva
Rivers of Kyzyl
Physiographic provinces
Braided rivers in Russia
West Siberian Plain